Ksar Kaddour is a town in south-central Algeria.

References 

Communes of Adrar Province